Attensity provides social analytics and engagement applications for social customer relationship management (social CRM). Attensity's text analytics software applications extract facts, relationships and sentiment from unstructured data, which comprise approximately 85% of the information companies store electronically.

History
Attensity was founded in 2000. An early investor in Attensity was In-Q-Tel, which funds technology to support the missions of the US Government and the broader DOD.  InTTENSITY, an independent company that has combined Inxight with Attensity Software (the only joint development project that combines two InQTel funded software packages), is the exclusive distributor and outlet for Attensity in the Federal Market. In 2009, Attensity Corp., then based in Palo Alto, merged with Germany's Empolis and Living-e AG to form Attensity Group. In 2010, Attensity Group acquired Biz360, Inc., a provider of social media monitoring and market intelligence solutions. In early 2012, Attensity Group divested itself of the Empolis business unit via a management buyout; that unit currently conducts business under its pre-merger name.

Attensity Group is a closely held private company. Its majority shareholder is Aeris Capital, a private Swiss investment office advising a high-net-worth individual and his charitable foundation. Foundation Capital, Granite Ventures, and Scale Venture Partners were among Biz360's investors and thus became shareholders in Attensity Group.

In February, 2016, Attensity's IP assets were acquired by InContact, and Attensity closed.

See also 
 Text mining

References

External links 
 
 

Natural language processing
Software companies based in the San Francisco Bay Area
Companies based in Redwood City, California
Research support companies
Software companies of the United States
Software companies established in 2000
American companies established in 2000
American companies disestablished in 2016